The Vektor SS-77 is a general-purpose machine gun designed and manufactured by Denel Land Systems—formerly Lyttleton Engineering Works (LIW)—of South Africa.

History 
In the late 1970s, South Africa was involved in an international controversy over apartheid and the South African Border War in Angola. As a result, it was subject to an international arms embargo and had to, out of necessity, design and manufacture its own weapons. The SS-77 was developed to replace the FN MAG. It was designed in 1977 by Richard Joseph Smith and Lazlo Soregi. The "SS" in its name stands for Smith and Soregi, and "77" for 1977, the year it was designed.

Denel unveiled at the Africa Aerospace and Defence (AAD) 2016 exhibit that the SS-77 will be replaced in production by the DMG-5 and DMG-5 CX GPMG.

SS-77s typically feed ammunition using an R1M1 disintegrating link belt, though M13 disintegrating link belts and non-disintegrating DM1 belts are also compatible. The belt may also be further contained in a dust-proof nylon pouch with a 100-round capacity, or a waterproof and rigid box with a 200-round capacity.

Mini-SS 
At around 1994, a light machine gun version, the Mini-SS, chambered in 5.56×45mm NATO was introduced. LIW also manufactured kits to convert existing SS-77 to the Mini-SS.

Variants 

SS-77 is the 7.62×51mm NATO calibre
Mini-SS is chambered for 5.56×45mm NATO.
Mini-SS Compact
DMG-5

Users 
: Policía Nacional de Colombia, Infantería de Marina de Colombia.
 Democratic Forces for the Liberation of Rwanda
: Kenya Air Force: For IAR 330 helicopters.

: Royal Malaysian Navy-PASKAL and Malaysian Maritime Enforcement Agency
: Mini-SS for the Peruvian Army
: Philippine National Police-Special Action Force
: 215 SS-77 MK1 LMGs acquired in late 2008 and delivered in 2009.
: SS-77 machine guns were delivered in 1992. Some were captured by the Rwandan Patriotic Front.
: Mini-SS
: General-purpose machine gun of the South African National Defence Force. Issued since 1986.

Popular culture

Video games 
 Arma 3, in DLC Western Sahara (« SA-77 »)

References

External links

Manufacturer's website

5.56×45mm NATO machine guns
7.62×51mm NATO machine guns
General-purpose machine guns
Squad automatic weapons
Light machine guns
Post–Cold War weapons of South Africa
Infantry weapons of the Cold War
Cold War firearms of South Africa
Firearms of South Africa
Military equipment introduced in the 1970s
Denel